Torsten Andersen (born 27 March 1949) is a Danish former footballer who played as a forward. He made six appearances for the Denmark national team from 1977 to 1979.

References

External links
 
 

1949 births
Living people
Footballers from Copenhagen
Danish men's footballers
Association football forwards
Denmark international footballers
Akademisk Boldklub players
R.S.C. Anderlecht players
Kjøbenhavns Boldklub players
Hellerup IK players
Danish expatriate men's footballers
Danish expatriate sportspeople in Belgium
Expatriate footballers in Belgium